The Twin Cities and Western Railroad Glencoe Subdivision was first charted in 1878 by the Hastings and Dakota Railroad. The company built tracks from Hopkins, Minnesota to Montevideo, Minnesota in 1878. They extended them to Ortonville, Minnesota by 1879.

The Hastings and Dakota Railroad had a large junction at Cologne, Minnesota to access this line. It was taken over by the Chicago, Milwaukee, St. Paul and Pacific Railroad in the 1880s. Milwaukee Later built the Lake Street depression to connect to St. Paul, which was known as "the shortline".
Milwaukee Railroad relocated large portions of the line between Hopkins and Cologne in 1913. The Milwaukee Road operated until it was purchased by Soo Line Railroad in 1985. Soo Line sold the line off to the Twin Cities and Western Railroad in 1991.

References

Minnesota railroads